The Siemens Avenio is a low floor tram family produced by Siemens Mobility, a subsidiary of the German conglomerate Siemens. It is the successor to the Combino family. The first generation was sold as the Combino Supra , Combino MkII, or Combino Plus. With the introduction of the second generation in 2009 the Combino brand was dropped and Siemens have referred to Combino Plus trams in Almada (Portugal) and Budapest (Hungary) as part of the Avenio range.

The Avenio is made of stainless steel instead of light materials, and is manufactured at a new assembly line in Vienna. Like the Combino it utilizes a modular design with standardised components, with resulting reduced costs.

Differences between the Combino and the Combino Supra
Unlike the Combino, the Combino Supra is designed in  fixed sections. Each section has a bogie, either powered or unpowered. The length can be anywhere from two sections to eight. In Budapest and Almad, modules are in two-car blocks, each connected by a double articulation joint. In the Combino and other articulated low-floor trams, the modules are suspended between the bogies.

For Budapest, the length went from nine modules of the Combino to six for the Combino Supra.

The Combino had a half-width door near the driver's cab, where the Combino Supra has a full double-leaf door.

Combino Plus

Budapest
The city transport company of Budapest ordered 40 Combino Supra Budapest NF 12B units for the city's tram network. The six-module trams (three units of two sections) are 53.99 meters long, exceeded only by the 59.4 m CarGoTrams in Dresden, thus making them the longest passenger trams in the world at the time of their introduction. (In 2016 56 meters long CAF Urbos 3 trams entered service in Budapest.) The first two units were delivered on March 14, 2006, and the rest was delivered by the summer of 2007.

In the summer of 2006 problems arose. On August 1, 2006 Budapest mayor Gábor Demszky ordered all six trams to be withdrawn from service until technical problems were cleared up. There were problems with the doors, caused by sensitive fail-safe systems that brought trams to a halt for reasons including luggage or the odd leg getting stuck in a door. Siemens AG reportedly admitted the door problem to be a "design fault".

Another problem was the overhead wires, rebuilt in April and June for the new trams. This was done in a hurry and of poor quality, causing the Ganz trams still running to have problems with their pantographs. On July 15 one traction mast fell to the road on the Margaret Bridge, causing tram services to be suspended between Jászai Mari tér and Moszkva tér till July 25. In the last week of August the overhead was adjusted to prevent new problems from occurring.

The teething problems were eventually sorted out, and all 40 trams were in regular service by the summer of 2007. But Siemens realises further improvements in the ventilation (the vehicles were ordered without air conditioning), and door closing signals will be changed, after inhabitants of the streets passed complained that they are too loud by night.

Almada

Metro Transportes Sul de Tejo (MST) ordered 24 four-module Combino Plus vehicles for a new light rail system in Almada, south of Lisbon. The first unit was delivered by the end of May 2005, but after the problems with the Combino surfaced the order was converted to stainless steel-bodied Combinos, to be delivered by 2007.

Melbourne
Siemens leased Almada tram C008 to Melbourne's tram network for research and development purposes. It entered service on Grand Prix shuttles on route 96 shuttles on 18 March 2007, before commencing a three-month stint on route 16 the following day, running alongside the classic Combino and other tram models.

Toronto
The Combino Plus was offered by Siemens in August 2007 in its bid to deliver 204 articulated, low-floor vehicles for the Toronto streetcar system as replacements for aging CLRVs and ALRVs. Siemens withdrew their first bid, citing an inability to meet the TTC's 25-percent Canadian content requirement. When tenders were reopened in August 2008, Siemens bid again using the same model, but their price was 50 percent higher than that of Bombardier's locally built Flexity Outlook model, who subsequently won the bid.

Siemens Avenio 
The Avenio brand was introduced at the UITP 2009 trade fair in Vienna, marketed as the "longest tram in the world" with 100% low floor (referring to the 72 meter version with eight modules).

Avenio is based on the Siemens Combino Plus but is simplified. There is now one secondary spring which now seemingly can do the work of two. There are more seats over the bogies. There are no more hydraulics and the tram is made of CorTen steel. So in fact it is a completely new design.

Tel Aviv 
It was announced that the first production series would go to Tel Aviv in Israel for its upcoming light rail network, but the project was delayed and the construction of the first line, the Red Line, started in September 2011. It will be in operational in 2016-2017 with the majority of stations underground. However, Tel Aviv Municipality later awarded the bid for rolling stock to rival CAF of Zaragoza, Spain instead.

The Hague 

HTM Personenvervoer of The Hague in the Netherlands, the operator of the city's tram network, announced in November 2011 the purchase of 40 Avenio trams. The contract is worth 100 million euro including driver training and spare parts. They are being built in Wien Simmering, with the bogies  in Graz. In March 2014 it was announced a further 20 trams were being ordered. The first (5003) entered service on 2 November 2015 on Route 2. Power and breaking is controlled by pedals.

Doha 
A consortium led by Siemens is building a tram system for Education City in Doha, the capital of Qatar. The opening was scheduled for autumn 2015 but has been delayed to 2016. No overhead wires will be installed, since the 10 Avenio trams will be powered by the Siemens Sitras HES system (Hybrid Energy Storage), a combination of a supercapacitor and a traction battery that will be charged at each stop through an overhead conductor rail.

Munich 
On 28 September 2012, Münchner Verkehrsgesellschaft (MVG) of Munich, Germany, announced an order of 8 Avenio trams for that city's tramway system. They are 36 m long, 2.3 m wide and have 4 modules. The contract was worth approx. 29 million Euros and it is understood that this allows six units to be built ahead of the Den Haag trams. Due to bad management and ongoing problems with the Stadler Variobahns the Avenios were necessary to deliver the advertised service improvements in the new timetable effective December 2013. They were supposed to be fully operational in little more than a year, however the first entered service on 17 September 2014 on Route 19.

Copenhagen 
29 Avenios will operate Hovedstadens Letbane (Greater Copenhagen Light Rail) from its opening in 2025.

Avenio M and Avenio HF
For systems that still prefer to use the Combino concept, can order the Avenio M. Systems that require trams that can stop at high-platform stops, can order the Avenio HF.

See also
 Combino
 Astra Imperio

References

External links
Official Avenio webpage

Light rail vehicles
Tram vehicles of Hungary
Tram vehicles of Portugal
Siemens tram vehicles
Articulated passenger trains